Lost Empires is a 1965 novel by the British writer J. B. Priestley. A young man comes of age in the provincial music hall just before the outbreak of the First World War. It was set in a similar milieu to Priestley's earlier work The Good Companions.

In 1986 it was adapted into a television series of the same name starring Colin Firth, John Castle, Laurence Olivier. A BBC radio dramatisation by Bert Coules starring Tom Baker as Nick Ollanton was first broadcast in 1994, most recently repeated on BBC Radio 4 Extra in May 2020.

References

Bibliography
 John Baxendale. Priestley’s England: J. B. Priestley and English culture. Manchester University Press, 2013.
 Maggie B. Gale. J.B. Priestley. Routledge, 2008.

1965 British novels
Novels by J. B. Priestley
Novels set in the 1910s
British novels adapted into television shows
Heinemann (publisher) books